The girls' combined competition at the 2018 Summer Youth Olympics was held at the Parque Urbano on 7 and 9 October.

Results

Qualification

Speed

Bouldering

Lead

Summary

Final

Speed
Quarterfinals

Semifinals

Finals

Bouldering

Lead

Summary

References

Sport climbing at the 2018 Summer Youth Olympics